Bryan Josué Acosta Ramos (born 24 November 1993) is a Honduran professional footballer who plays as a midfielder for Major League Soccer club Colorado Rapids and the Honduras national team.

Club career
Born in La Ceiba, Honduras, Acosta started his professional career with Real C.D. España. He made his debut on 23 September 2013 in a 1–1 draw with C.D.S. Vida. He scored his first goal on 16 April 2014 in a 2–1 loss to C.D. Victoria.

On 12 July 2017, Acosta signed a four-year deal with Spanish side CD Tenerife. He made his debut on 18 August 2017 in the Segunda División against Real Zaragoza in a 2–1 win. He scored his first goal the following 30 November in a 2–1 loss to RCD Espanyol in the first leg of the round of 32 tie in the Copa del Rey.

On 8 January 2019, Acosta signed for Major League Soccer side FC Dallas as a Designated Player. He made his debut on the following 2 March in a 1–1 draw with New England Revolution and scored his first goal seven days later in the 2–0 win against the LA Galaxy. Following the 2021 season, Acosta's contract option was declined by Dallas.

During the 2021 MLS Re-Entry Draft, Acosta's rights were selected by the Colorado Rapids. He officially signed with the Rapids on 19 January 2022.

International career

Honduras U-23
Acosta was chosen to represent Honduras at the 2016 Summer Olympics in Rio de Janeiro. He captained his team throughout the tournament and played in all 6 matches, including the bronze medal match, in which Honduras 3–2 to Nigeria.

Honduras
On 26 February 2014, Acosta was called up for a friendly against Venezuela. He made his debut for the national team the following 6 March after coming off the bench to replace Walter Williams in a 2–1 win.

Personal life
He was born to Raymundo Acosta and Adilia Ramos.

Acosta had to receive permission from Real España to get a few hours off to marry his fiancée Mavis Hernández on Friday 21 August 2015,
a day before the club had to play the Clásico Sampedrano against Marathón. The ceremony was led by former footballer Carlos Oliva, but was not attended by any of his teammates because of the forthcoming derby game.

Career statistics

Club

International

International goals
Scores and results list Honduras' goal tally first.

References

External links
 
 

1993 births
Living people
People from La Ceiba
Association football midfielders
Honduran footballers
Liga Nacional de Fútbol Profesional de Honduras players
Real C.D. España players
CD Tenerife players
FC Dallas players
Colorado Rapids players
Colorado Rapids 2 players
Designated Players (MLS)
2014 Copa Centroamericana players
Olympic footballers of Honduras
Honduras international footballers
Honduran expatriate footballers
Honduran expatriate sportspeople in Spain
Expatriate footballers in Spain
Major League Soccer players
MLS Next Pro players
Central American Games gold medalists for Honduras
Central American Games medalists in football
Segunda División players
2015 CONCACAF Gold Cup players
Footballers at the 2016 Summer Olympics
2017 CONCACAF Gold Cup players
2019 CONCACAF Gold Cup players
2021 CONCACAF Gold Cup players